Tepeyurt (old name: Kutunet-i Ulya (قوطونت علیا)) is a village in the Arhavi District, Artvin Province, Turkey. Its population is 129 (2021).

References

Villages in Arhavi District
Laz settlements in Turkey